Loaded is the second studio album by American rapper Brotha Lynch Hung, released on September 16, 1997 by Blackmarket Records. The album features guest appearances from Kokane, E-40 and Ice-T, and is the first album on which Lynch would collaborate with producer Phonk Beta, a partnership that would continue on his future albums.

The album peaked at number 28 on the Billboard 200.

Track listing

Personnel

Brotha Lynch Hung – vocals, production
Cedric Singleton – executive producer, layout, graphic art & photography
Phonk Beta – production
First Degree the D.E. – production
Art B – management

Charts

References

1997 albums
Brotha Lynch Hung albums